Clavus japonicus is a species of sea snail, a marine gastropod mollusk in the family Drilliidae.

Description
The length of the shell attains 16 mm.

The elevated spire is acute, with a ridge below the sutures. The 8 longitudinal ribs are rounded, oblique, crossed by close strong striae, and terminate above on the periphery. The color of the shell is yellowish brown with two chestnut bands, or the lower one broader so as to cover the lower portion of the body whorl. The anal sinus is small, but rather deep. The shell shows two decided varices on the body whorl and one on the penultimate whorl.

Distribution
This marine species occurs off Japan, Hong Kong, the Philippines and off the Solomon Islands
.

References

 Lischke. Mal. Blat., xvi, p. 105 ; Jap. Meer. Conch., p. 32, 1869
 Bao Quan Li, Richard N. Kilburn & Xin Zheng Li (2010): Report on Crassispirinae Morrison, 1966 (Mollusca: Neogastropoda: Turridae) from the China Seas, Journal of Natural History, 44:11–12, 699-740

External links
 

japonicus
Gastropods described in 1869